Private placement (or non-public offering) is a funding round of securities which are sold not through a public offering, but rather through a private offering, mostly to a small number of chosen investors. Generally, these investors include friends and family, accredited investors, and institutional investors.

PIPE (Private Investment in Public Equity) deals are one type of private placement. SEDA (Standby Equity Distribution Agreement) is also a form of private placement. They are considered to present lower transaction costs for the issuer than public offerings.

Since private placements are not offered to the general public, they are prospectus exempt. Instead, they are issued through Offering Memorandum. Private placements come with a great deal of administration and have normally been sold through financial institutions such as investment banks. New FinTech companies now offer an automated, online process making it easier to reach potential investors and reduce the administration.

In the United States
Although these placements are subject to the Securities Act of 1933, the securities offered do not have to be registered with the Securities and Exchange Commission if the issuance of the securities conforms to an exemption from registrations as set forth in the Securities Act of 1933 and the associated SEC rules put into effect. Most private placements are offered under the Rules known as Regulation D. Different rules under Regulation D provide stipulations for offering a Private Placement, such as required financial criteria for investors or solicitation allowances. Private placements may typically consist of offers of common stock or preferred stock or other forms of membership interests, warrants or promissory notes (including convertible promissory notes), bonds, and purchasers are often institutional investors such as banks, insurance companies or pension funds. Common exemptions from the Securities Act of 1933 allow an unlimited number of accredited investors to purchase securities in an offering. Generally, accredited investors are those with a net worth in excess of $1 million or annual income exceeding $200,000 or $300,000 combined with a spouse. Under these exemptions, no more than 35 non-accredited investors may participate in a private placement. In most cases, all investors must have sufficient financial knowledge and experience to be capable of evaluating the risks and merits of investing in a company.

Rankings
Thomson Reuters provides annual and semiannual rankings of private placement agencies by capital raised.

References

External links
United States Securities and Exchange Commission (SEC) – Official site

Securities (finance)
Investment